Marti Halverson (born 1959/1960 in New Britain, Connecticut) is an American politician who served as a Republican member of the Wyoming House of Representatives from District 22 from January 8, 2013, until January 8, 2019.

Elections
2012: When Democratic Representative Jim Roscoe chose not to seek re-election and left the District 22 seat open, Halverson was unopposed for the August 21, 2012, Republican primary, winning with 925 votes, and won the November 6, 2012, general election with 2,407 votes (49.2%) against Independent candidate Bill Winney, who had sought the seat in 2010.

References

External links
Official page at the Wyoming Legislature
 

2020 United States presidential electors
21st-century American politicians
21st-century American women politicians
Living people
Republican Party members of the Wyoming House of Representatives
People from Lincoln County, Wyoming
Politicians from New Britain, Connecticut
Republican National Committee members
Women state legislators in Wyoming
Year of birth missing (living people)